Sorell Creek is a rural residential locality in the local government area of Derwent Valley in the South-east region of Tasmania. The 2016 census determined a population of 89 for the state suburb of Sorell Creek.

History
Sorell Creek was gazetted as a locality in 1970.

Geography
The Derwent River forms the northern boundary. Sorell Creek (the watercourse) forms part of the southern boundary before flowing through to the north.

Road infrastructure
The Lyell Highway (A10) enters from the east and runs through to the west, where it exits. Route C615 (Molesworth Road) starts at an intersection with A10 and runs south until it exits.

References

Localities of Derwent Valley Council
Towns in Tasmania